Below you will find a concise list of Belgian banks. The big four are KBC, Belfius, BNP Paribas Fortis, and ING.

Other

Financial Trust Bank
HSBC Bank plc
National Bank of Belgium

References

External links

Belgian banking, finance and insurance commission
Belgian Federation of the Financial Sector
Members of FEBELFIN
List of banks in Belgium with SWIFT codes, branches' locations and contact information
Belgium Banks and Banking Review - News, information about banks, offices and ATMs

Banks
Belgium
 
Belgium